Walter Edward Gibbins (14 April 1890 – 17 March 1964) was an Australian rules footballer who played with Carlton in the Victorian Football League (VFL).

Notes

External links 

Wally Gibbins's profile at Blueseum

1890 births
Australian rules footballers from Melbourne
Carlton Football Club players
Williamstown Football Club players
1964 deaths
People from Carlton, Victoria